Marshall M. Sloane (April 15, 1926 – April 6, 2019) was an American businessman who was the founder and chairman of Century Bank.

Biography 
In 1969, Sloane founded Century Bank.  He was a  Trustee of Boston University, his alma mater (Questrom School of Business).  In 2007, he stepped down as Chair of Boston University School of Dental Medicine Board of Visitors after 17 years.
Sloane was awarded the Boy Scouts of America's Silver Buffalo Award. Sloane served on the BSA National Executive Board, the organization's governing board.

Sloane died on April 6, 2019, nine days before his 93rd birthday.

References

1926 births
2019 deaths
American chairpersons of corporations
National Executive Board of the Boy Scouts of America members
Boston University School of Management alumni